The following individuals are general officers of the Church of Jesus Christ of Latter-day Saints (LDS Church). General officers of the LDS Church are distinguished from general authorities; all general officers are members of a presidency of an organization of the church.

Primary

Relief Society

Sunday School

Young Men

Young Women

See also

List of general authorities of the Church of Jesus Christ of Latter-day Saints
List of area seventies of the Church of Jesus Christ of Latter-day Saints

References

External links
General Authorities and General Officers at ChurchofJesusChrist.org.

 
General officer
General off
General officers